David Grayson may refer to:
David Grayson, pseudonym of Ray Stannard Baker
David Grayson (American football) (born 1964), American football player 
Dave Grayson (1939–2017), American football player